The Brown Line of the Chicago "L" system, is an  route with 27 stations between Chicago's Albany Park neighborhood and downtown Chicago. It runs completely above ground and is almost entirely grade-separated. It is the third-busiest 'L' route, with an average of 19,255 passengers boarding each weekday in 2021.

Before CTA lines were color-coded in 1993, the Brown Line was known as the Ravenswood Route; specifically, the series of stations from Belmont to Kimball were called the Ravenswood branch. Accordingly, the Kimball-Belmont shuttle service was called the Ravenswood Shuttle.

Route 

The Brown Line begins on the northwest side of Chicago, at the Kimball terminal in Albany Park, where there is a storage yard and servicing shop for the trains to the east of the passenger station.

The trains on the street-level section are powered by third rail rather than overhead catenary (the technology used by most other U.S. electric-powered at-grade rail systems), a decision that exposes wayward pedestrians to the risk of electrocution. A fatal accident in 1977 involving an intoxicated man, who did not speak English and was unable to read the posted warning signage, attempted to urinate on the third rail at the  station eventually resulted in an Illinois Supreme Court decision in 1992 affirming a verdict of $1.5 million against CTA.

After the  station, the route turns south, about one-half block parallel and west of Metra's Union Pacific North railroad line and Ravenswood Avenue to a point south of the  station. Here the route turns east again and runs parallel to Roscoe Street past Sheffield Avenue where it once again turns south at Clark Junction to join the four-track North Side elevated line in Lakeview. Brown and Purple Line trains run on the outermost tracks serving five stops, while Red Line trains run on the innermost tracks making only two stops.

Running over Franklin, then Wells Street, a stop is made at the  before crossing the Chicago River on the upper level of the Wells Street Bridge before joining the Loop Elevated at Lake Street. Operating counter-clockwise, Brown Line trains operate around the Loop on the Outer track via Wells-Van Buren-Wabash-Lake, serving all Loop stations, before the return trip back north to the Kimball terminal.

There are three sections of the Brown Line which includes the Ravenswood Branch that connects from Kimball Avenue station to Belmont Avenue station; merging from the Purple Line Express. Another is the North Side Main Line which connects from Belmont Avenue station to the Merchandise Mart before entering the Loop.

Operating hours and headways
The Brown Line operates between Kimball and the Loop weekdays and Saturdays from 4 a.m. to 1:30 a.m. and on Sundays from 5 a.m. to 1:30 a.m. The Brown Line Shuttle service runs only between Kimball and Belmont between 1:30 a.m. and 2:25 a.m. At Belmont, southbound riders can transfer to the 24-hour Red Line. On weekdays, service runs between three and eight minutes during rush hour, seven to eight minutes during midday, then six to twelve minutes during nighttime. 

On weekends, early morning service operates every fifteen minutes, then increases to seven to eight minutes on Saturdays during the day and ten minutes on Sundays during the day, then at nighttime every ten to twelve minutes. Late night service operates every fifteen minutes until the end of service, although late night trips from Kimball to Belmont stations operate every half hour Monday thru Saturday nights.

During morning rush hour, several Brown Line trains bound for the Loop continue toward the Orange Line after stopping at the Harold Washington Library station; whereas several Orange Line trains bound for Kimball continue as the Brown Line after stopping at Adams/Wabash station.

Rolling stock 
The Brown Line is operated with the 2600-series and 3200-series railcars. The Brown Line operates using eight cars during weekday rush hours and four cars at other times. In the meantime, CTA has completed the process of overhauling the 3200-series cars with color LED destination signs (similar to the 5000-series cars), new air conditioning systems, rebuilt propulsion systems, passenger door motors, and wheel/axle assemblies. The 3200-series rehabilitation began in 2015 and was completed in 2018. Later that year, some of the Brown Line's 3200-series cars were transferred to the Blue Line, with some of the Orange Line's 2600-series cars being transferred to the Brown Line.

Beginning in March 2008, the Brown Line began running eight cars during rush hours, since all of the reopened or renovated stations have been rebuilt to accommodate eight cars. Prior to this, although ridership certainly warranted eight cars on the Brown Line during weekday rush hours, most stations on the line couldn't berth longer than six cars. Early morning, midday, late evening, and weekend service is generally provided by four cars, although this may be extended to eight cars due to special events and holidays.

History
The Northwestern Elevated Railroad opened the line, originally known as the Ravenswood line,  between the existing main line and Western Avenue in Lincoln Square on May 18, 1907. The route was completed to the Kimball terminal on December 14, 1907.

The Kimball terminal was completely renovated and a new bridge over the North Branch of the Chicago River was completed in the 1970s. The Western and Merchandise Mart stations were rebuilt in the 1980s. Prior to the start of the Brown Line Capacity Expansion Project, these two stations, along with the Kimball terminal were the only ADA accessible stations on the Brown Line outside of the Loop.

Brown Line Capacity Expansion Project

The Brown Line Capacity Expansion Project—which ran from 2006 to 2009—was undertaken to repair ageing infrastructure and increase passenger capacity at Brown Line stations. In February 2006, the CTA broke ground on the project. All but one of the Brown Line stations were reconstructed to be ADA compliant and to accommodate eight-car trains. The right-of-way between Kimball and Rockwell Avenue was modernized. Traction power equipment and train control systems were upgraded and a new fiber optic communication network installed.

Merchandise Mart was the only station not to receive any work as it had previously been reconstructed from 1987 to 1988, and was already ADA compliant and able to accommodate 8-car trains. Another two stations—Kimball and Western—received small platform extensions but little other work, and the other 16 stations were completely rebuilt.

The first two stations to be completed—Kedzie and Rockwell—reopened on August 16, 2006, and all of the stations had reopened by July 30, 2009, when the new Wellington station entered service. The project was completed on December 31, 2009.

Red-Purple Bypass 
The Red & Purple Modernization Project includes a redesign of a diamond junction north of Belmont Station into a flyover allowing Brown Line trains going north to circumnavigate crossings with Red and Purple Line trains. This project will decrease train backups and increase the number of trains that can cross the junction per hour. The project was criticized by 2015 mayoral candidate Chuy García and local residents in the Lakeview neighborhood who organized a referendum to stop it. 

The Federal Transit Administration passed the CTA's environmental review on the bypass in January 2016 and received a $1.1 billion federal grant the following year. 16 properties affected by the bypass were demolished, while the historic Vautravers Building was relocated 30 feet west to preserve it.  Construction on the bypass began on October 2, 2019 and the bypass was opened to its first train at 4am on November 19, 2021.

Station listing 

Note: After stopping at Clark/Lake, Brown Line trains return to Merchandise Mart, then make all stops back to Kimball.

References

External links 

 Brown Line at CTA official site

 
Railway lines opened in 1907
Railway lines in Chicago
1907 establishments in Illinois